The 1895–96 Scottish Second Division was won by Abercorn with Linthouse finishing bottom.

Table

References

Scottish Football Archive

Scottish Division Two seasons
2